Koththamalli is a flavoured tea beverage made by brewing coriander seeds and ginger. It is a traditional Sri Lankan home remedy for curing the common cold. Coriander and ginger have long being recognised for their Ayurvedic properties.

Ingredients
 1.5 cups of dried coriander seeds
 6 cups of water
 3 slices of fresh ginger root or one tablespoon ginger powder
 15 black peppercorns (optional)

Preparation
Wash and drain the coriander seeds, lightly dry roast the seeds for approximately five minutes (to bring out the essential oils, aroma and flavor). A variation to this recipe is to dry roast the coriander seeds with the black peppercorns. Add water and ginger then allow to simmer, until the amount of water has reduced by half. Strain and pour into drinking glasses - serve hot/warm. Add jaggery (raw cane sugar), or kithul pani (raw coconut treacle), or honey to sweeten, according to individual's taste.

References

Blended tea
Sri Lankan drinks
Tea culture
Herbal tea